The Col du Portillon (elevation ) is a mountain pass in the Pyrenees on the border between France and Spain. It connects Bagnères-de-Luchon in France with Bossòst in the Val d'Aran,
Spain.

Details of climb
The steepest section is at 8.2%,  from the summit.

The final  is at an average gradient of 8.4%, with the steepest section being at 13.9%.

Appearances in Tour de France
The Col du Portillon was first used in the Tour de France in 1957, since when it has featured 20 times, most recently in 2018, when the leader over the summit was Adam Yates.

References

External links
 Col du Portillon on Google Maps (Tour de France classic climbs)

Mountain passes of Haute-Garonne
Mountain passes of Catalonia
Mountain passes of the Pyrenees
France–Spain border crossings